Oppenauer oxidation, named after , is a gentle method for selectively oxidizing secondary alcohols to ketones.

The reaction is the opposite Meerwein–Ponndorf–Verley reduction. The alcohol is oxidized with aluminium isopropoxide in excess acetone. This shifts the equilibrium toward the product side.

The oxidation is highly selective for secondary alcohols and does not oxidize other sensitive functional groups such as amines and sulfides. Though primary alcohols can be oxidized under Oppenauer conditions, primary alcohols are seldom oxidized by this method due to the competing aldol condensation of aldehyde products. The Oppenauer oxidation is still used for the oxidation of acid labile substrates. The method has been largely displaced by oxidation methods based on chromates (e.g. pyridinium chlorochromate) or dimethyl sulfoxide (e.g. Swern oxidation) or Dess–Martin oxidation due to its use of relatively mild and non-toxic reagents (e.g. the reaction is run in acetone/benzene mixtures). The Oppenauer oxidation is commonly used in various industrial processes such as the synthesis of steroids, hormones, alkaloids, terpenes, etc.

Mechanism

In the first step of this mechanism, the alcohol (1) coordinates to the aluminium to form a complex (3), which then, in the second step, gets deprotonated by an alkoxide ion (4) to generate an alkoxide intermediate (5). In the third step, both the oxidant acetone (7) and the substrate alcohol are bound to the aluminium. The acetone is coordinated to the aluminium which activates it for the hydride transfer from the alkoxide. The aluminium-catalyzed hydride shift from the α-carbon of the alcohol to the carbonyl carbon of acetone proceeds over a six-membered transition state (8). The desired ketone (9) is formed after the hydride transfer.

Advantages
An advantage of the Oppenauer oxidation is its use of relatively inexpensive and non-toxic reagents. Reaction conditions are mild and gentle since the substrates are generally heated in acetone/benzene mixtures. Another advantage of the Oppenauer oxidation which makes it unique to other oxidation methods such as pyridinium chlorochromate (PCC) and Dess–Martin periodinane is that secondary alcohols are oxidized much faster than primary alcohols, thus chemoselectivity can be achieved. Furthermore, there is no over oxidation of aldehydes to carboxylic acids as opposed to another oxidation methods such the Jones oxidation.

Modifications

Wettstein-Oppenauer reaction
In the Wettstein-Oppenauer reaction, discovered by Wettstein in 1945, Δ 5–3β-hydroxy steroids are oxidized to Δ 4,6-3-ketosteroids with benzoquinone as the hydrogen acceptor. This reaction is useful in that it affords a one-step preparation of Δ 4,6-3-ketosteroids.

Woodward modification
In the Woodward modification, Woodward substituted potassium tert-butoxide for the aluminium alkoxide. The Woodward modification of the Oppenauer oxidation, also called the Oppenauer–Woodward oxidation, is used when certain alcohol groups do not oxidize under the standard Oppenauer reaction conditions. For example, Woodward used potassium tert-butoxide and benzophenone for the oxidation of quinine to quininone, as the traditional aluminium catalytic system failed to oxidize quinine due to the complex formed by coordination of the Lewis-basic nitrogen to the aluminium centre.

Other modifications 
Several modified aluminium alkoxide catalysts have been also reported. For example, a highly active aluminium catalyst was reported by Maruoka and co-workers which was utilized in the oxidation of carveol to carvone (a member of a family of chemicals called terpenoids) in excellent yield (94%).

In another modification the catalyst is trimethylaluminium and the aldehyde 3-nitrobenzaldehyde is used as the oxidant, for example, in the oxidation of isoborneol to camphor.

Synthetic applications
The Oppenauer oxidation is used to prepare analgesics in the pharmaceutical industry such as morphine and codeine. For instance, codeinone is prepared by the Oppenauer oxidation of codeine.

The Oppenauer oxidation is also used to synthesize hormones. Progesterone is prepared by the Oppenauer oxidation of pregnenolone.

A slight variation of the Oppenauer oxidation is also used to synthesize steroid derivatives. For example, an efficient catalytic version of the Oppenauer oxidation which employs a ruthenium catalyst has been developed for the oxidation of 5-unsaturated 3β-hydroxy steroids to the corresponding 4-en-3-one derivative.

The Oppenauer oxidation is also used in the synthesis of lactones from 1,4 and 1,5 diols.

Side reactions
A common side-reaction of the Oppenauer oxidation is the base-catalyzed aldol condensation of aldehyde product, which have α-hydrogens to form either β-hydroxy aldehydes or α, ß-unsaturated aldehydes. 

Another side reaction is the Tischenko reaction of aldehyde products with no α-hydrogen, but this can be prevented by use of anhydrous solvents. Another general side reaction is the migration of the double bond during the oxidation of allylic alcohol substrates.

See also
 Alcohol oxidation
 Pyridinium chlorochromate
 Jones oxidation
 Pfitzner–Moffatt oxidation
 Parikh–Doering oxidation
 Albright-Goldman oxidation
 Swern oxidation
 Corey–Kim oxidation
 Dess–Martin periodinane oxidation
 Ley oxidation (TPAP oxidation)
 TEMPO oxidation

References

Organic oxidation reactions
Name reactions